Arvid Nelson is an American comic book writer, best known for Rex Mundi.

Life and career
Nelson started writing comics while at Dartmouth College, where he also converted to the Baháʼí Faith. After graduating in 1999 he became a production assistant on a Woody Allen film, but it was while working on a documentary about The Paris Review that he visited Paris and started picking up influences that would lead to his creating Rex Mundi.<ref name=cbr18089 It was planned as a 38 issue series and ends with issue #19. He has also created spin-off stories, like "Hill of Martyrs" which started in Rex Mundi #14 and continued online.

Nelson has also worked at Marvel and DC. For the former he wrote a Nightcrawler story in X-Men Unlimited. At DC he wrote a Mr Terrific story in JSA Classified and the first one-shot of The Joker's Asylum series.

One major literary influence is Robert E. Howard and Nelson has worked on a Kull limited series at Dark Horse and in May 2009 it was announced that he would be writing Thulsa Doom for Dynamite Entertainment.

Bibliography

Rex Mundi (#1–18, Image Comics, 2002–06, #1–19, Dark Horse Comics, 2006–09) collected as:
Volume 1: The Guardian of the Temple (collects Rex Mundi (vol. 1) #0–5, Image Comics, Dark Horse Comics)
Volume 2: The River Underground (collects Rex Mundi (vol. 1) #6–11, Image Comics, Dark Horse Comics) 
Volume 3: The Lost Kings (collects Rex Mundi #12–17, Dark Horse Comics)
Volume 4: Crown and Sword (collects Rex Mundi (vol. 1) #18, Rex Mundi (vol. 2) #1–5 and "To Weaver A Lover" in The Dark Horse Book of Monsters, Dark Horse Comics)
Volume 5: The Valley at the End of the World (collects Rex Mundi (vol. 2) #6–12, Dark Horse Comics)
Volume 6: Gate of God (collects Rex Mundi (vol. 2) #13–19, Dark Horse Comics)
X-Men Unlimited (vol. 2) #7 (with pencils by Lewis Larosa and inks by Tom Palmer, Marvel Comics, April 2005)
killer7 (2006)
Zero Killer (2007)
 "Mr Horrific" (with Alex Sanchez, in JSA Classified #29–31, DC Comics, 2007)
The Joker's Asylum: "The Joker" (with Alex Sanchez, one-shot, DC Comics, 2008)
Kull (with Will Conrad, 5-issue limited series, Dark Horse Comics, 2008–09)
Thulsa Doom (with artist Lui Antonio, Dynamite Entertainment, 2009)
Red Sonja (with artist Jackson Herbert, Dynamite Entertainment, 2009–2010, forthcoming)
 Rage: After the Impact (with artists Andrea Mutti, Pierluigi Baldassini, Michael Atiyeh, Dark Horse Comics, 2011)
 Thulsa Doom (with artists Lui Antonio, Dark Horse Comics, 2011)
 Warlord of Mars (with artist Carlos Rafael, Dynamite Entertainment, 2011-2014)
 Red Bull's E-Sport Comic: The Fateful 8 Volume 2 (with artist Yvel Guichet, Dark Horse Comics, 2015)
The Great Wall (with artist Gian Fernando, Legendary Pictures, 2017)
Skull Island: The Birth of Kong (with artist Zid, Legendary Pictures, 2017)

See also
List of Baháʼís
Baháʼí Faith in fiction

Notes

References

External links

Interviews
'Rex'-N-Effect: An Interview with Arvid Nelson, Comics Bulletin

American Bahá'ís
Living people
Year of birth missing (living people)
Dartmouth College alumni
Converts to the Bahá'í Faith
20th-century Bahá'ís
21st-century Bahá'ís